Bone Town is an unincorporated community in Alberta, Canada within Lac La Biche County that is recognized as a designated place by Statistics Canada.

Demographics 

As a designated place in the 2011 Census, Bone Town had a population of 88 living in 27 of its 34 total dwellings, a 31.3% change from its 2006 population of 67.

See also 
List of communities in Alberta

References 

Former designated places in Alberta
Localities in Lac La Biche County